Thierry Zahui (born 22 October 1987) is an Ivorian former football player and current assistant coach of Lunds BK.

He has previously played for Landskrona BoIS and the Chicago Fire Reserves.

Career
On 14 August 2019, Zahui returned to Assyriska BK.

At the end of 2020, Zahui decided to retire and was hired as an assistant coach at Lunds BK.

References

External links

Insports profile 

1987 births
Living people
Westchester Flames players
Chicago Fire U-23 players
Levadiakos F.C. players
Landskrona BoIS players
Helsingborgs IF players
KSF Prespa Birlik players
Norrby IF players
Varbergs BoIS players
Assyriska BK players
FC Rosengård 1917 players
Superettan players
Ettan Fotboll players
USL League Two players
Super League Greece players
Ivorian footballers
Ivorian expatriate sportspeople in the United States
Ivorian expatriate sportspeople in Greece
Expatriate soccer players in the United States
Expatriate footballers in Greece
Association football midfielders